Hostage Working Group was organized by the U.S. Department of State at the US Embassy in Baghdad in the summer of 2004 to monitor hostages in Iraq. Reported as meeting "weekly to bring together officials from the FBI, the Defense Department, the State Department and the Iraqi government. Officials do not publicly discuss the actions they can take against kidnappers."1 

In an interview in the magazine, Talk Through, of the UK's Ministry of Defence Police, April/May 2005, PC Peter Anderson, who was working with the Hostage Working Group (HWG) describes himself as: "the only non-American in this 30-strong group." 

Erik Rye was identified as the director of the Hostage Working Group at the US Embassy in Baghdad in an editorial 3 in the International Herald Tribune on May 17, 2006.

A statement issued September 7, 2006 by the White House 4 identified another group working out of the US Embassy in Baghdad, the Office of Hostage Affairs. It is unknown if this is a new group or an alternative name for the Hostage Working Group.

External links
 Hostages of War International Herald Tribune, May 17, 2006
Fast Chat: 'She Came Home Alive' Newsweek, April 10, 2006
Job Description for the Coordinator of the Hostage Working Group USAJobs.org, June 22, 2005
Talk Through (PDF) The Magazine of the UK's Ministry of Defence Police, Living the Baghdad experience, May/April, 2005
U.S. Hostages Kept Low Profile In Ritzy Baghdad Neighborhood Larry Kaplow, Cox News Service, September 9, 2004
Victim's Tale... International Herald Tribune, May 7, 2006
State Department Briefing March 7, 2006
Some Grounds for Optimism over Wood Australian Broadcasting Corporation March 5, 2005
The Missing Newsweek, March 13, 2006

Iraq War
Iraqi insurgency (2003–2011)

Hostage taking